The United Arab Republic (UAR), or simply the Arab Republic or Arabia, was a sovereign state in the Middle East from 1958 until 1971. It was initially a political union between Egypt (including the occupied Gaza Strip) and Syria from 1958 until Syria seceded from the union after the 1961 Syrian coup d'état. Egypt continued to be known officially as the United Arab Republic until 1971.

The republic was led by Egyptian President Gamal Abdel Nasser. The UAR was a member of the United Arab States, a loose confederation with the Mutawakkilite Kingdom of Yemen, which was dissolved in 1961.

History

Origins

The United Arab Republic was established on 1 February 1958 as the first step towards a larger pan-Arab state, originally being proposed to Egyptian President Gamal Abdel Nasser by a group of political and military leaders in Syria.

Pan-Arab sentiment traditionally was very strong in Syria, and Nasser was a popular heroic figure throughout the Arab world following the Suez Crisis of 1956. There was thus considerable popular support in Syria for union with Nasser's Egypt. The Arab Socialist Ba'ath Party was the leading advocate of such a union.

In mid-1957, Western powers began to worry that Syria was close to a Communist takeover; it had a highly organized Communist Party and the newly appointed army's chief of staff, Afif al-Bizri, was a Communist sympathizer. This caused the Syrian Crisis of 1957 after which Syrians intensified their efforts to unite with Egypt. Nasser told a Syrian delegation, including President Shukri al-Quwatli and Prime Minister Khaled al-Azem, that they needed to rid their government of Communists, but the delegation countered and warned him that only total union with Egypt would end the "Communist threat". According to Abdel Latif Boghdadi, Nasser initially resisted a total union with Syria, favoring instead a federal union. However, Nasser was "more afraid of a Communist takeover" and agreed on a total merger. The increasing strength of the Syrian Communist Party, under the leadership of Khalid Bakdash, worried the Syrian Ba'ath Party, which was suffering from an internal crisis from which prominent members were anxious to find an escape. Syria had a democratic government since the overthrow of Adib al-Shishakli's military regime in 1954, and popular pressure for Arab unity was reflected in the composition of parliament.

When on 11 January 1958 al-Bizri led a Syrian delegation composed of military officers to Cairo, and personally encouraged Syrian-Egyptian unity, Nasser opted for a quick merger. Only Syrian advocates of unity, including Salah al-Din Bitar and Akram El-Hourani had prior knowledge of this delegation; Quwatli and Azem were notified a day later and considered it tantamount to a "military coup".

Nasser's final terms for the union were decisive and non-negotiable: "a plebiscite, the dissolution of parties, and the withdrawal of the army from politics". While the plebiscite seemed reasonable to most Syrian elites, the latter two conditions were extremely worrisome. They believed it would destroy political life in Syria. Despite these concerns, the Syrian officials knew it was too late to turn back. The members of the elite in Syria viewed the merger with Egypt as the lesser of two evils. They believed that Nasser's terms were unfair, but given the intense pressure that their government was undergoing, they believed that they had no other choice.

A plebiscite was held on February 21, 1958, with Egyptians and Syrians voting in favor of the merger. The result were announced on February 22 and Nasser was declared the new president of the United Arab Republic.

Egyptian and Syrian leaders signed the protocols, although Azem did so reluctantly. Nasser became the republic's president and very soon carried out a crackdown against the Syrian Communists and opponents of the union which included dismissing Bizri and Azem from their posts.

Early history
Advocates of the union believed that Nasser would use the Ba'ath Party for ruling Syria. Unfortunately for the Ba'athists, it was never Nasser's intention to share an equal measure of power. Nasser established a new provisional constitution proclaiming a 600-member National Assembly with 400 members from Egypt and 200 from Syria, and the disbanding of all political parties, including the Ba'ath. Nasser gave each of the provinces two vice-presidents, assigning Boghdadi and Abdel Hakim Amer to Egypt and Sabri al-Assali and Akram El-Hourani – a leader of the Ba'ath – to Syria. The new provisional constitution of 1958 was adopted.

Though Nasser allowed former Ba'ath Party members to hold prominent political positions, they never reached positions as high in the government as did the Egyptian officials. During the winter and the spring of 1959–60, Nasser slowly squeezed prominent Syrians out of positions of influence. In the Syrian Ministry of Industry, for example, seven of the top thirteen positions were filled by Egyptians. In the General Petroleum Authority, four of the top six officials were Egyptian. In the fall of 1958, Nasser formed a tripartite committee, consisting of Zakaria Mohieddine, al-Hawrani, and Bitar to oversee the affairs in Syria. By moving the latter two, both Ba'athists, to Cairo, he neutralized important political figures who had their own ideas about how Syria should be run within the UAR.

In Syria, opposition to union with Egypt mounted. Syrian Army officers resented being subordinate to Egyptian officers, and Syrian Bedouin tribes received money from Saudi Arabia to prevent them from becoming loyal to Nasser. Also, Egyptian-style land reform was resented for damaging Syrian agriculture, the Communists began to gain influence, and the intellectuals of the Ba'ath Party who supported the union rejected the one-party system. Mustafa al-Barudi, the Syrian Minister of Propaganda, stated that 'the smallest member of the (Egyptian) retinue thought that he had inherited our country. [Egyptians] spread "like octopuses" everywhere.' Nasser was not able to address problems in Syria completely, because they were new to him, and instead of appointing Syrians to run Syria, he assigned this position to Amer and Abdel Hamid Sarraj (a Syrian army official and Nasser sympathizer).

In Egypt, the situation was more positive, with a GNP growth of 4.5 per cent and a rapid growth of industry. In 1960, Nasser nationalized the Egyptian press, reducing it to his personal mouthpiece.

Foreign relations
The union was interpreted by the other nations of the world as a major threat to Jordan. Syria was seen as a source of instigation and shelter for Jordanian plotters against King Hussein. Egypt's own status as a state hostile to Western involvement in the region (and thus to the close relationship between the British, in particular, and the Jordanian and Iraqi monarchies) added to the pressure. Hussein responded by proposing to Faisal II of Iraq a Jordanian-Iraqi union to counter the UAR; such a union formed on 14 February 1958 as the Arab Federation. Jordan and Iraq agreed to establish a unified military command with a unified military budget, 80 per cent of which was to be provided by Iraq and the remaining 20 per cent by Jordan. Troops from both countries were exchanged in the arrangement.

In nearby Lebanon, President Camille Chamoun, an opponent of Nasser, viewed the creation of the UAR with worry. Pro-Nasser factions in the country, mostly comprising Muslims and Druze, began clashing with the Maronite population who generally supported Chamoun, culminating in a civil war by May 1958. The former favoured merging with the UAR, while the latter feared the new country as a satellite of Communism. Although Nasser did not covet Lebanon, seeing it as a special case, he felt obliged to back his supporters through giving Abdel Hamid Sarraj the task of sending them money, light arms, and training officers.

On 14 July 1958, Iraqi army officers staged a military coup and overthrew the Kingdom of Iraq – which had just previously united with Jordan to form the rival Arab Federation. Nasser declared his recognition of the new government and stated that "any attack on Iraq was tantamount to an attack on the UAR". The next day US Marines and British special forces landed in Lebanon and in Jordan, respectively, to protect the two countries from falling to pro-Nasser forces. To Nasser, the revolution in Iraq opened the road for Arab nationalism. Although most members of the Iraqi Revolutionary Command Council (RCC) favoured joining Iraq with the UAR, the new prime minister Abdel Karim Qasim disagreed. Said K. Aburish states reasons for this could have included Nasser's refusal to cooperate with and encourage the Iraqi Free Officers a year before the coup – or Qasim viewed Nasser as a threat to his supremacy as leader of Iraq.

Later in July, the US government convinced Chamoun not to seek a second term. This allowed the election of Fuad Chehab as Lebanon's new president. Nasser and Chehab met at the Lebanese–Syrian border and Nasser explained to Chehab that he never wanted unity with Lebanon, but only that the country not be used as a base against the UAR. This meeting resulted in the end of the crisis in Lebanon, with Nasser ceasing to supply his partisans and the US setting a deadline for withdrawing from the area.

After the overthrow of its Hashemite monarchy in 1958, Iraq became the Arab state most supportive of the UAR. Iraq sought to join the union; however, in 1959 Qasim cancelled the unity talks. After Qasim's overthrow in 1963 the union idea resurrected with the proposal of Egypt, Iraq, and Syria reforming the UAR. A new flag was proposed, with three stars symbolizing the three states constituting the proposed union. However, the plan for a tri-partite union never materialised. Iraq continued to use the three-star flag and later adopted it as the national flag. This three-star flag remained Iraq's national flag (with some modifications) until 2007.

Flag
The UAR adopted a flag based on the Arab Liberation Flag of the Egyptian Revolution of 1952, but with two stars to represent the two parts of the UAR. From 1980 this has been the official flag of Syria. In 1963, Iraq adopted a flag that was similar but with three stars, representing the hope that Iraq would join the UAR. The current flags of Egypt, Sudan and Yemen are also based on the Arab Liberation Flag of horizontal red, white and black bands.

Nationalization

In June 1960, Nasser tried to establish economic reforms that would bring the Syrian economy more in line with the strong Egyptian public sector. However, these changes did little to help either economy. Rather than shift growth toward the private sector, Nasser embarked on an unprecedented wave of nationalizations in both Syria and Egypt. These began in July 1961, without consulting top Syrian economic officials. The entire cotton trade was taken over by the government, as well as all import-export firms. Nasser announced the nationalization of banks, insurance companies, and all heavy industry, July 23, 1961. Nasser also extended his social justice principles. The land limit was reduced from 200 to 100 feddans. Interest rates for farmers were dramatically reduced to the point of elimination in some cases. A ninety percent tax was instituted on all income above £E10,000. Workers and employees were allowed representatives on management boards. They were also given the right to a twenty-five percent share in the profit of their firm. The average workday was also cut from eight hours to seven without a reduction in pay.

Collapse

Instead of a federation of two Arab peoples, as many Syrians had imagined, the UAR turned into a state completely dominated by Egyptians. Syrian political life was also diminished, as Nasser demanded all political parties in Syria to be dismantled. In the process, the strongly centralized Egyptian state imposed Nasser's socialistic political and economic system on weaker Syria, creating a backlash from the Syrian business and army circles, which resulted in the Syrian coup of September 28, 1961, and the end of the UAR. According to Elie Podeh, "... this unity scheme was successful in consolidating the shaky Syrian identity. In fact, once the Syrians lost their independence they suddenly realized that they did indeed possess a different identity than the Egyptians."

Despite the economic difficulties, what truly produced the demise of the UAR was Nasser's inability to find a suitable political system for the new regime. Given his socialist agenda in Egypt, the Ba'ath should have been his natural ally, but Nasser was hesitant to share power. Though Amer allowed some liberalization of the economy in order to appease Syrian businessmen, his decision to rig the elections of the National Union (the single party which replaced the Ba'ath), with the help of Colonel Abdul Hamid Sarraj (a Syrian army official and Nasser sympathizer), antagonized Ba'athist leaders. The Ba'ath Party won only five percent of the seats on the higher committees, while the more traditional conservative parties won a significant majority. Sarraj was appointed the head of the National Union in Syria, and by the spring of 1960 had replaced Amer as the chair of the Syrian Executive Council. Under Sarraj Syria was ruled by a repressive security force designed to suppress all opposition to the regime.

The immense increases in public sector control were accompanied by a push for centralization. In August 1961 Nasser abolished regional governments in favour of one central authority, which operated from Damascus February through May and from Cairo for the rest of the year. As a part of this centralization, Sarraj was relocated to Cairo, where he found himself with little real power. September 15, 1961, Sarraj returned to Syria, and after meeting with Nasser and Amer resigned from all his posts on September 26.

Without any close allies to watch over Syria, Nasser was unaware of the growing unrest of the military. On September 28 a group of officers staged a coup and declared Syria's independence from the UAR. Though the coup leaders were willing to renegotiate a union under terms they felt would put Syria on an equal footing with Egypt, Nasser refused such a compromise. He initially considered sending troops to overthrow the new regime, but chose not to once he was informed that the last of his allies in Syria had been defeated. In speeches that followed the coup, Nasser declared he would never give up his goal of an ultimate Arab union. However, he would never again achieve such a tangible victory toward this goal.

After Syria's withdrawal

After Syria's withdrawal from the union in 1961, Egypt retained its "United Arab Republic" name until 1971.

From 5 to 10 June in 1967, Israel seized control of the Gaza Strip, the West Bank, the Golan Heights, and the Sinai Peninsula during the Six-Day War. Eventually, the Sinai Peninsula was returned to Egypt in 1978. The withdrawal of Israel from the Gaza Strip in 2005 was not followed by resumption of control by Egypt. Since 2007, the Gaza Strip has been controlled by the Islamist militant group Hamas.

Geography

If it existed today, the United Arab Republic would be the 25th largest nation on the planet (Egypt is 30th and Syria is 88th). It was comparable in size to South Africa, and twice the size of France. Following the dissolution of the All-Palestine Government, the United Arab Republic further exerted control over the Gaza Strip, until the Six-Day War.

See also
Armed Forces of the United Arab Republic
History of modern Egypt
Pan-Arabism
Arab Federation (1958) – The Kingdom of Iraq and the Kingdom of Jordan
United Arab States (1958–1961) – Egypt, the Kingdom of North Yemen, and Syria
Federation of Arab Republics (1972–1977) – Egypt, Libya, and Syria
Arab Islamic Republic (1974) – Libya and Tunisia
Invasion of Kuwait (1990–1991) – Iraq and Kuwait
United Arab Emirates

References

Footnotes

Bibliography

External links

Encyclopedia.com
Syria: A Country Study

 
1958 establishments in Africa
1958 establishments in Asia
1958 in Egypt
1958 in Syria
1959 in Egypt
1959 in Syria
1960 in Egypt
1960 in Syria
1971 disestablishments in Africa
1961 disestablishments in Asia
1961 in Egypt
1961 in Syria
20th century in Egypt
20th century in Syria
Arab League
Arab nationalism in Egypt
Arab nationalism in Syria
Articles containing video clips
Egypt–Syria relations
Former countries in Africa
Former countries in Western Asia
Former republics
Former confederations
Gaza Strip
Former Arab states
Former member states of the United Nations
Former socialist republics
Pan-Arabism
States and territories disestablished in 1971
States and territories established in 1958